The Rockford IceHogs were a minor professional ice hockey team in Rockford, Illinois. They were a member of the United Hockey League from 1999 to 2007. The IceHogs played their home games at the MetroCentre. In 2007, the name and logo were purchased and applied to the current American Hockey League franchise. After the transfer of the name and logo to the AHL franchise was complete, the UHL IceHogs ceased operations.

The IceHogs began play in October 1999. The team name, IceHogs, was selected during a "name-the-team" contest. The team came to Rockford when United Sports Ventures bought the rights of the Thunder Bay Thunder Cats UHL franchise, one of the original franchises in the Colonial Hockey League in 1991 as the Thunder Bay Thunder Hawks. On October 23, 2002, Tri Vision Sports purchased the franchise from United Sports Ventures.

The IceHogs and Nashville Predators of the National Hockey League signed an affiliation agreement on December 13, 2005. The IceHogs supplied players to Nashville's primary affiliate, the Milwaukee Admirals of the American Hockey League. The IceHogs hired Steve Martinson as head coach for the 2004–05 season, and he led the IceHogs to their best season in franchise history, winning their first division championship. The IceHogs were also been named the 2004–05 and 2005–06 UHL Member Franchise of the Year for the club's success on and off the ice. During the 2006–07 season, the IceHogs played in the UHL's Western Division with the Quad City Mallards, Chicago Hounds, Bloomington PrairieThunder, and Fort Wayne Komets. The Ice Hogs won their only Colonial Cup in game seven at home on May 24, 2007, by a score of 3–1 against the Kalamazoo Wings.

Every year the team held a "Jersey Night" during which the team wore a special, one-off alternate jersey and auctioned them off for charity. Many of the alternate jerseys were related to cultural icons such as Elvis Presley and St. Patrick's Day, or were autographed by Rockford-area celebrities such as Rick Nielsen.

The UHL IceHogs were replaced by an American Hockey League team of the same name for the 2007–08 season. The MetroCentre purchased the IceHogs name and logo from Tri Vision Sports and applied them to the new AHL franchise. The new team had also signed a ten-year player development contract with the Chicago Blackhawks.

Season-by-season results

Season results were compiled from hockeydb.com and Pointstreak.com.

References

External links
Rockford IceHogs

Defunct United Hockey League teams
Defunct ice hockey teams in Illinois
Icehogs UHL
Ice hockey clubs established in 1999
Sports clubs disestablished in 2007
Ice hockey teams in Illinois
1999 establishments in Illinois
2007 disestablishments in Illinois
Nashville Predators minor league affiliates

fr:IceHogs de Rockford